KVOK-FM is a Contemporary Hit Radio formatted broadcast radio station licensed to Kodiak, Alaska, serving Metro Kodiak. KVOK-FM is owned and operated by Kodiak Island Broadcasting Company, Inc.

HD radio
The station's HD2 subchannel carries a country format known as 98.7 KVOK. This feeds a translator at 98.7 FM. The format was that previously heard on KVOK 560 AM until it went off the air in May 2019 after losing its transmitter site.

References

External links
 Hot 101.1 Online
 
 

VOK-FM
Contemporary hit radio stations in the United States
Radio stations established in 1989
1989 establishments in Alaska